The ARIA Dance Chart is a chart that ranks the best-performing dance singles of Australia. It is published by Australian Recording Industry Association (ARIA), an organisation who collect music data for the weekly ARIA Charts. To be eligible to appear on the chart, the recording must be a single, and be "predominantly of a dance nature, or with a featured track of a dance nature, or included in the ARIA Club Chart or a comparable overseas chart".



Chart history

Number-one artists

See also

2012 in music
List of number-one singles of 2012 (Australia)
List of number-one club tracks of 2012 (Australia)

References

Australia Dance
Dance 2012
Number-one dance singles